The term "The Great Old Ones" may also refer to a group of Cthulhu Mythos deities. 

The Great Old Ones is an album by noise rock group Lubricated Goat, released in 2003 by Reptilian Records. It featured 2003 re-recordings of previously released Lubricated Goat and Crunt tracks.

Track listing

Personnel

Lubricated Goat
Ant Migliaccio – guitar
Hayden Millsteed – drums, percussion, backing vocals
Jack Natz – bass guitar, backing vocals
Stu Spasm – lead vocals, guitar, cover art

Production and additional personnel
Joel Hamilton – engineering, mixing
Tony Maimone – engineering, mixing
Doug Milton – mastering

Release history

References

External links 
 The Great Old Ones at Discogs (list of releases)

2003 albums
Lubricated Goat albums